Southend and District Reform Synagogue is a Reform Jewish synagogue in Southend-on-Sea, England.

History
Founded in 1946, the synagogue is affiliated with the Movement for Reform Judaism. It produces a newsletter, Hakol Shel Sinai. The congregation's part-time rabbi is Warren Elf MBE, who is based in Manchester and is also the part-time rabbi at Liverpool Reform Synagogue in Liverpool.

See also
 List of Jewish communities in the United Kingdom
 List of former synagogues in the United Kingdom
 Movement for Reform Judaism

References

External links

1946 establishments in England
Jewish communities in Essex
Reform synagogues in the United Kingdom
Religious organizations established in the 1940s
Buildings and structures in Southend-on-Sea
Synagogues in England